Teplýšovice is a municipality and village in Benešov District in the Central Bohemian Region of the Czech Republic. It has about 500 inhabitants.

Administrative parts
Villages of Čeňovice, Humenec, Kochánov and Zálesí are administrative parts of Teplýšovice.

References

Villages in Benešov District